Zikanyrops dubiosa is a moth in the family Dalceridae. It was described by Walter Hopp in 1928. It is found in Bolivia.

References

Moths described in 1928
Dalceridae
Moths of South America